Wurmbea sinora is a species of plant in the Colchicaceae family that is endemic to Australia.

Description
The species is a cormous perennial herb that grows to a height of 1.5–8 cm. Its white flowers appear from July to September.

Distribution and habitat
The species is found in the Avon Wheatbelt, Esperance Plains, Jarrah Forest, Mallee and Warren IBRA bioregions of south-western and southern Western Australia. It grows in loam and sandy clay soils over granite rocks in seasonally-wet areas and salt marshes.

References

sinora
Monocots of Australia
Angiosperms of Western Australia
Plants described in 1980
Taxa named by Terry Desmond Macfarlane